Pablo Defazio (born 15 May 1981) is a Uruguayan sailor. He and Mariana Foglia placed 17th in the Nacra 17 event at the 2016 Summer Olympics.

References

1981 births
Living people
Uruguayan male sailors (sport)
Olympic sailors of Uruguay
Sailors at the 2016 Summer Olympics – Nacra 17
Sailors at the 2020 Summer Olympics – Nacra 17
Pan American Games medalists in sailing
Pan American Games bronze medalists for Uruguay
Sailors at the 2007 Pan American Games
Sailors at the 2011 Pan American Games
Medalists at the 2007 Pan American Games
Medalists at the 2011 Pan American Games
Vaurien class sailors